Terry Grant may refer to:
 Terry Grant (gridiron football), American football player
 Terry Grant (stunt driver), British stunt driver
 Terry Grant, tracker featured in Canadian reality television series Mantracker